The Old Man of Belem (Portuguese: O Velho do Restelo) is a 2014 Portuguese-French short film directed by Manoel de Oliveira.

Cast
Luís Miguel Cintra as Camões
Ricardo Trepa as Don Quixote
Diogo Dória as Teixeira de Pascoaes
Mário Barroso as Camilo Castelo Branco

Reception
It was screened at the Out of Competition section of the 71st Venice International Film Festival.

References

External links

2014 films
2010s biographical films
Films based on Portuguese novels
Films directed by Manoel de Oliveira
French short films
Portuguese short films
2014 short films
2010s French films